Sunniva Ørstavik (born 13 June 1967) is a Norwegian civil servant, who served as the Gender Equality and Anti-Discrimination Ombud from 2010 to 2016.

She is a sociologist by education, and was secretary-general of the Norwegian Council for Mental Health from 2005 to 2010 and the Gender Equality and Anti-Discrimination Ombud from 2010 to 2016.

She received the Rights Prize (Rettighetsprisen) in 2015 for work combating domestic violence.

References

1967 births
Living people
Directors of government agencies of Norway
Ombudsmen in Norway